Normal model may refer to:

Normal distribution, a type of continuous probability distribution
A model of interpreting equality (see Interpretation (logic)#Interpreting equality)